Siri is an Italian surname. Notable people with the surname include:

 Alejandro Siri (born 1963), Argentine field hockey player 
 Enzo Siri (born 2002), Uruguayan footballer
 Florent Emilio Siri (born 1965), French film director
 Giuseppe Siri (1906–1989), Italian cardinal
 José Siri (born 1995), a Dominican professional baseball outfielder 
 Linn Siri Jensen (born 1961), Norwegian team handball goalkeeper and coach
 Martin Siri (born 1979), Argentine cricketer
 Nicolás Siri (born 2004), Uruguayan footballer
 Preecha Siri, Karen-Thai conservationist and environmentalist
 Román Fresnedo Siri (1903–1975), Uruguayan architect
 Santipap Siri (born 1985), Thai footballer
 Vittorio Siri or Francesco Siri (1608–1685). Italian mathematician and Benedectine monk 
 William Siri (1919–2004), American biophysicist

See also 
 Sironi